The 2007–08 season was Deportivo de La Coruña's 37th season in La Liga, the top division of Spanish football. They also competed in the Copa del Rey. The season covered the period 1 July 2007 to 30 June 2008.

Season summary

After a poor 2006–07 campaign, in which Deportivo finished 13th, coach Joaquín Caparrós was fired, and replaced by Real Sociedad's Miguel Ángel Lotina, who signed a one-year contract.

Lotina improved Depor'''s league form, and they ended the year in 9th, qualifying for the 2008 UEFA Intertoto Cup. However, they fell at the first hurdle in the Copa del Rey, being eliminated in the round of 32 by Espanyol.

Kit

Deportivo's kit was manufactured by Canterbury of New Zealand and sponsored by Fadesa.

Players
SquadRetrieved on 27 March 2021Left club during season

Out on loan for the full season

Transfers

In

Out

 Squad stats Last updated on 29 March 2021.|-
|colspan="14"|Players who have left the club after the start of the season:|}

Season results
Pre-season

La Liga

League table

Positions by round

Matches

Copa del Rey

Round of 32Espanyol won 3–2 on aggregate''

Coaching staff

See also
2007–08 La Liga
2007–08 Copa del Rey

References

External links 
  
Unofficial Spanish fansite 
Another unofficial Spanish fansite 
Official international website
Official international forum 
Polish site 
Unofficial arabic fansite
Unofficial Turkey Fan 
Unofficial Russian Fan

Deportivo de La Coruna
Deportivo de La Coruña seasons